Meilhards is a commune in the Corrèze department in central France.

Geography

Location
The municipality is bordered by the department of Haute-Vienne.

Neighbouring communes and villages

Hydrography
Commune watered by the Bradascou, and its tributary the Ganaveix which takes its source in the communal territory.

Population

Local Culture and heritage

Places and monuments
 Château de Lachaud
 Tomb of Philippe de Meilhards XVIII, classified by the fine Arts.
 14th Century Church.
 Chapelle Sainte-Radegonde with miraculous fountain.

Cults
For the Catholic cults, Meilhards depended on the diocese of Tulle, and is part of the inter-parochial ensemble of Chambert-Treignac: The deanery of the Middle Vézère.

See also
Communes of the Corrèze department

References

Communes of Corrèze